The Ottawa Gee-Gees represent the University of Ottawa in Canadian Interuniversity Sport women's ice hockey. Home games are contested at the uOttawa Minto Sports Complex, and the Gee-Gees are members of the Quebec Student Sports Federation.

Exhibition

NCAA

PWHL

History
Shelley Coolidge became head coach of the program in the spring of 2003. During the 2003-04 campaign, she guided the Gee-Gees to the CIS national championship game where they were defeated by the Alberta Pandas. In 2006-07 she guided the Gee-Gees to a 12-6-0 record, the best in program history.

On January 16, 2008, the Gee Gees hosted a game at Scotiabank Place in Ottawa, as the Gee-Gees played the Carleton Ravens. In 2008, the Gee-Gees hosted the CIS national tournament and finished with a 1-2 record in the tourney. Their only win came in a shoot-out victory over St. Francis Xavier, where the Gee-Gees prevailed by a 7-6 tally. Heading into the 2008-09 season, goaltender Jessika Audet was the oldest varsity student-athlete at uOttawa.

In her first appearance for the Ottawa Gee-Gees, Fannie Desforges scored a goal versus the York Lions in an exhibition game on September 20, 2008 as she scored a goal in a 4-0 shutout victory. In her first ever regular season game (contested on October 18, 2008), she scored her first CIS goal in a victory over the Concordia Stingers.

Year by year

International
At the 2011 Street and Ball Hockey World Championships in Bratislava, Slovakia, Fannie Desforges and Danika Smith participated for Team Canada. They would claim a silver in the tournament.

Winter Universiade

Melodie Bouchard, Forward : 2017 Winter Universiade
Shelley Coolidge Assistant Coach : 2009 Winter Universiade

Other
In February 2010, Kayla Hottot was one of the female qualifiers for a Red Bull Crashed Ice competition. She would advance to the 2010 Red Bull Crashed Ice World Championship finals in Québec City in March 2010. Other Gee Gees women's ice hockey players that have competed in the Red Bull Crashed Ice include Fannie Desforges and Dominique Lefebvre.

Having competed in the Red Bull Crashed Ice competitions from 2012 to 2015, Gee Gees forward Alicia Blomberg achieved a podium finish in 2014, capturing the bronze medal in the world championships.  of Finland captured the gold medal while fellow Canadian Jacqueline Legere grabbed the silver medal.

Awards and honours
Melodie Bouchard, 2015-16 U Sports All-Canadian Second Team
Melodie Bouchard, 2015-16 U Sports All-Rookie
Fannie Desforges, Player of the Game, Game 2 of 2010 Theresa Humes Tournament
Fannie Desforges, Ottawa Gee Gees MVP (2011)
 Kayla Hottot, 2008 CIS tournament all-star team

RSEQ Awards
Shelley Coolidge, 2003-04 RSEQ Coach of the Year
Danika Smith, 2008-2009 RSEQ Marion-Hilliard Award for best combining sport, academic and community service
2016-17 RSEQ LEADERSHIP & CITIZENSHIP AWARD (CIS Marion Hilliard Award nominee): Vickie Lemire

RSEQ All-Stars
First Team All-Star
 Kim Kerr, First-team all-star RSEQ 2006-2007 
 Danika Smith, 2006-2007 RSEQ first-team all-star 
Valérie Watson, 2011-12 RSEQ FIRST ALL-STAR TEAM
2016-17 RSEQ First Team All-Stars: Bryanna Newald
2016-17 RSEQ First Team All-Stars: Mélodie Bouchard, Ottawa 
2019-20 RSEQ FIRST TEAM ALL-STAR: Christine Deaudelin

Second Team All-Star
Christine Allen, Second-team all-star RSEQ 2006-2007 
Christine Allen, Second-team all-star RSEQ 2007-2008 
Jessika Audet, 2008-09 second-team RSEQ all-star 
Fannie Desforges, 2008-2009 Second-team RSEQ All-Star 
Fannie Desforges, RSEQ 2012 Second Team All-Star
Kelsey DeWit, 2008-09 second-team RSEQ all-star 
Érika Pouliot, 2008-2009 second-team RSEQ all-star 
 Danika Smith, 2005-2006 RSEQ second-team all-star
2011-12 RSEQ SECOND ALL-STAR TEAM: Fannie Desforges
2019-20 RSEQ SECOND TEAM ALL-STAR: Aurélie Dubuc, Ottawa
2019-20 RSEQ SECOND TEAM ALL-STAR: Mélodie Bouchard, Ottawa

RSEQ All-Rookies
2011-12 RSEQ ALL- ROOKIE TEAM: Stéphanie Mercier
2011-12 RSEQ ALL- ROOKIE TEAM: Valérie Watson
2011-12 RSEQ ALL- ROOKIE TEAM: Élarie Leclair-Célestin
2019-20 RSEQ ALL-ROOKIE TEAM: Aurélie Dubuc
2019-20 RSEQ ALL-ROOKIE TEAM: Alice Fillion

U Sports Awards
Joelle Levac, 2007-2008 CIS academic all-Canadian 
Maude Laramée: 2012-13 USports All-Rookie Team

University Awards
Varsity President's Award
2016-17: Vickie Lemire 
2013-14: Stéphanie Mercier
2012-13: Alicia Blomberg
2011-12: Érika Pouliot 
2008-09: Chrsitine Allen
2004-05: Amy Bombay 
2003-04: Marlies Phillion
1999-2000: Karina Verdurn

Varsity Rookies of the Year
2019-20: Aurélie Dubuc 
2015-16: Mélodie Bouchard 
2014-15: Maude Lévesque-Ryan

Team captains
2006-07, Danika Smith & Sarah McLeish
2007-08, Danika Smith 
2008-09, Danika Smith
2010-11, Erika Pouliot
2011-12, Erika Pouliot
2012-13, Fannie Desforges

Team MVP
2014-15: Maude Lévesque-Ryan
2015-16: Mélodie Bouchard

Gee-Gees in pro hockey

References

Ice hockey teams in Ottawa
U Sports women's ice hockey teams
Women's ice hockey teams in Canada
Ottawa Gee-Gees
Ice hockey teams in Ontario
Women in Ontario